Railways Stadium Kabwe, is a multi-use stadium in Kabwe, Zambia. It is currently used mostly for football matches and serves as the home for Kabwe Warriors,. The stadium holds 10,000 people.

References

Football venues in Zambia
Kabwe
Buildings and structures in Central Province, Zambia